Moquegua Basin is a sedimentary basin in southernmost Peru. Sedimentary rocks of the basin, including those of Moquegua Group, crop out in the Central Depression  makes up part of the sedimenty fill of the basin. The basement of the basin is made of rocks older than the Cenozoic.

Despite being close to the Pacific Ocean Moquegua Basin appear to have been unaffected by the Oligo-Miocene marine transgression that affected many other basins of western South America such as nearby Pisco Basin. Concurrent with Andean uplift it is thought that the basin went from having a “balanced  basin-fill” between Oligocene and Middle Miocene having a “overfilled basin-fill” from the Middle Miocene to the present.

References 

Sedimentary basins of Peru
Forearc basins
Paleogene Peru
Neogene Peru
Paleontology in Peru
Basins
Basins